This article lists the winners and nominees for the NAACP Image Award for Outstanding Television Movie, Mini-Series or Dramatic Special.  Originally entitled Outstanding Drama Series, Mini-Series or Television Movie, the award was retitled to its current name in 1995.

Winners and nominees
Winners are listed first and highlighted in bold.

1980s

1990s

2000s

2010s

2020s

Multiple wins and nominations

Wins
 2 wins
 In the Heat of the Night

Nominations

 4 nominations
 Luther

 2 nominations
 American Crime
 In the Heat of the Night

References

NAACP Image Awards